Cumene (isopropylbenzene) is an organic compound that contains a benzene ring with an isopropyl substituent.  It is a constituent of crude oil and refined fuels.  It is a flammable colorless liquid that has a boiling point of 152 °C.  Nearly all the cumene that is produced as a pure compound on an industrial scale is converted to cumene hydroperoxide, which is an intermediate in the synthesis of other industrially important chemicals, primarily phenol and acetone (known as the cumene process).

Production
Commercial production of cumene is by Friedel–Crafts alkylation of benzene with propylene. Cumene producers account for approximately 20% of the global demand for benzene. The original route for manufacturing of cumene was by alkylation of benzene in the liquid phase using sulfuric acid as a catalyst, but because of the complicated neutralization and recycling steps required, together with corrosion problems, this process has been largely replaced.  As an alternative, solid phosphoric acid (SPA) supported on alumina was used as the catalyst. 

Since the mid-1990s, commercial production has switched to zeolite-based catalysts. In this process, the efficiency of cumene production is generally 70-75%. The remaining components are primarily polyisopropyl benzenes.  In 1976, an improved cumene process that uses aluminum chloride as a catalyst was developed. The overall conversion of cumene for this process can be as high as 90%.

The addition of two equivalents of propylene gives diisopropylbenzene (DIPB).  Using transalkylation, DIPB is comproportionated with benzene to give cumene.

Autoxidation
Depending on the conditions, autoxidation of cumene gives dicumyl peroxide or cumene hydroperoxide.  Both reactions exploit the weakness of the tertiary C-H bond.  The tendency of cumene to form peroxides by autoxidation poses safety concerns. Tests for peroxides are routinely conducted before heating or distilling.

See also 
 Pseudocumene

References

External links
National Pollutant Inventory - Cumene fact sheet
Cumene Production from Benzene and Propylene Using Aluminum Chloride Catalyst

Hazardous air pollutants
Alkylbenzenes
C3-Benzenes
Commodity chemicals
Suspected carcinogens
IARC Group 2B carcinogens
Isopropyl compounds